The Seattle Grizzlies is a United States Australian Football League team, based in Seattle, Washington, United States. It was founded in 1998 as the Seattle Jets by Matt Muller, Jim Trenerry, and Brendan Jenkins. They play in the USAFL, winning the Division 2 title in 2008 and most recently Division 3 in 2017. The club expanded in 2016 to include a women's team.

During the 2008 season, they played at Manhattan Park in Burien, a suburb of Seattle.

References

External links
 

Australian rules football clubs in the United States
Sports in Seattle
Australian rules football clubs established in 1998
1998 establishments in Washington (state)